Kabul Serena Hotel is a luxury hotel in downtown Kabul, Afghanistan. Originally built in 1945, the Kabul hotel was restored and expanded by AKDN and named as Kabul Serena Hotel. It was inaugurated by President Karzai and the Aga Khan in 2005.

Architecture

The five-star hotel was designed by Romesh Khosla - a Canadian-based architect. The building design reflects the classic Islamic architecture.

Facilities 

It is set in landscaped gardens, overlooking the city's Zarnegar Park. The hotel has 177 rooms and suites. It has several restaurants, including the Café Zarnegar serving Afghan cuisine, the Wild Rice fine-dining restaurant serving Southeast Asian cuisine, the Serena Pastry Shop serving homemade breads, cakes and patisseries and the Char Chata Lounge. The hotel also includes Maisha Spa & Health Club, offering a fitness centre, a steam room, a sauna, and outdoor heated swimming pool.

Incidents and closures
Adolph Dubs, United States ambassador to Afghanistan in 1979, was killed at the hotel.

The hotel was heavily damaged by civil war; it was completely refurbished and extended, reopening on November 8, 2005. The main work for the hotel was given to the Aga Khan Foundation and thus it was inaugurated by Aga Khan IV.

It was the target of terrorist attacks in January 2008 and March 2014.

Gallery

References

External links

Official site

1945 establishments in Afghanistan
Hotel buildings completed in 1945
Hotels established in 1945
Serena